The 1945 Boston College Eagles football team represented Boston College as an independent during the 1945 college football season. The Eagles were led by third-year head coach Moody Sarno, and played their home games at Alumni Field in Chestnut Hill, Massachusetts and Fenway Park in Boston. Boston College finished with a record of 3–4. Sarno was relieved of his duties as head coach at the conclusion of the season, as Denny Myers returned from his service in the Navy during World War II. Sarno compiled a record of 11–7–1 as head coach at Boston College.

Schedule

References

Boston College
Boston College Eagles football seasons
Boston College Eagles football
1940s in Boston